Catocala viviannae is a moth of the family Erebidae. It is found in Turkey and Iran.

Adults are on wing from July to August.

References

viviannae
Moths described in 1996
Moths of Asia